Great Pond is a  water body located in Rockingham County in southeastern New Hampshire in the United States. The lake lies near the center of the town of Kingston. Kingston State Park, a small preserve with a swimming beach, occupies the northeastern end of the lake, near the town center. The lake is located along the Powwow River, a tributary of the Merrimack River.

The lake is classified as a warmwater fishery, with observed species including smallmouth bass, largemouth bass, chain pickerel, white perch, black crappie, bluegill, yellow perch, and pumpkinseed.

YMCA Camp Lincoln is on the northwest side of the lake.

See also

List of lakes in New Hampshire

References

Lakes of Rockingham County, New Hampshire
Kingston, New Hampshire